Paul Dirmeikis (born 1954) is a French-speaking poet, composer, singer, and painter who lives in Brittany, France. He is of Lithuanian ancestry, and a member of the Lithuanian Composers Union.

Dirmeikis was born in Chicago, Illinois. As a writer, in the 1990s he began a large cycle of poems inspired by the German composer Karlheinz Stockhausen's entire musical output.

Works

Compositions (selective list)
Seventy compositions are now listed in his catalogue, including:
Message laissé à Pondichéry le 18 novembre 1973 (Message Left in Pondicherry on 18 November 1973), for voice, saxophone, electric bass, vibraphone, crystal glasses, percussion, and piano
Papier à musique (Music Paper), for voice and papers (4 performers)
Un seul or, for voice, flute, saxophone, electric bass, tampura, and piano
J. C., for voice, electric guitar, intratonal carillon, and computer-generated sounds (1983)
String Quartet No. 1, op. 1 (1984)
Le ciel sous la terre (Heaven in the Earth), String Quartet No. 2, op. 10 (1985)
Un unique corps (A Unique Body), for overtone singer, flute, tampura, mugaveena, and electric bass
Nous, les esprits, nous dansons (We, the Spirits, We Dance), for voice, two saxophones, percussion, electric bass, and synthesizer
Lame d'orage (Storm Blade), for voice, two saxophones, percussion, electric bass, piano, and synthesizer
Octa, op. 6, for two pianos in quarter tones (1984)
Le monde dans notre maison (The World in Our House), for voice, flute, saxophone, electric bass, percussion, piano, and synthesizer
Le serpent, for voice and computer-generated sounds
Visur (Everywhere), for soprano and computer-generated sounds
Dienaktis, electronic music for Lithuania (1988)
Motina (Mother), op. 18
Tevas (Father), op. 19
Krastas (Country), op. 20
Pavasaris (Spring), op. 21
Laikas (Time), op. 22
Susisristi (Links), op. 23
Gimimas (Birth), op. 24
Ausra (Dawn), String Quartet No. 3, op. 27 (1996)
Karma, op. 67, for string quartet and electronic and concrete music (2004) premiered by the Kaunas String Quartet at the "Is Arti" International Contemporary Music Festival in Kaunas
Entre Parenthèses, 31 songs on poems by René Guy Cadou, for baritone voice and various instrumental ensembles, op. 68 (2005–2007)
Sukaktuvès (Celebration), op. 70, for 3 oboes, 3 trumpets, and 3 bassoons, op. 70 (2007)
Aster (Star), op. 71, for wind quintet (2010) premiered by the Quintette à vent de Bretagne

Dirmeikis has been working since 2003 on a 22-part cycle, TAROT, for various instruments and/or electronic and concrete music.

Discography
Loup Rouge (LP – 1984) – L'Eveilleur EVE 001
Message laissé à Pondichéry le 18 novembre 1973 (CD – 1988) – L'Eveilleur EVE 002
17 Metacompositions – Electronic and concrete music (Audio DVD – 2002) – L'Eveilleur EVE 003
Entre Parenthèses – 31 poèmes de René Guy Cadou (2-CD set – 2009) – L'Eveilleur EVE 004

Writings
Limbres creusées – poems – Editions St Germain (1975)
La Peur – short stories – Editions Le Cherche-Midi (1978)
"Three Poems", Perspectives of New Music 36, no. 2 (Summer 1998): 41–52.
Le Souffle du temps (Quodlibet pour Karlheinz Stockhausen) – Editions Telo Martius (1999). This is a conversation book with the German composer Karlheinz Stockhausen whom Dirmeikis had known for 30 years.
L'Epaule d'Orphée – poetry – Foreword by Salah Stétié – Editions L'Eveilleur (2012)
Gwerz – poetry – Editions L'Eveilleur (2013)
Les Belles Choses – poetry – Editions L'Eveilleur (2014)
Je te réunirai – novel – Editions L'Eveilleur (2015)

Sources

Works cited

Further reading
 Anon. 2009. "Rencontre à Binic: Paul Dirmeikis et René Guy Cadou". Au fil de l'eau – Binic, no. 3 (Winter): 13.

External links

1954 births
Living people
Musicians from Chicago
21st-century classical composers
20th-century classical composers
American male classical composers
American classical composers
Writers from Chicago
American expatriates in France
American people of Lithuanian descent
21st-century American composers
20th-century American composers
Classical musicians from Illinois
20th-century American male musicians
21st-century American male musicians